Notable alumni of St. Edward High School in Lakewood, Ohio include:

Arts, entertainment, and academia
 Jerome Caja, 1976– performance artist
 Dan Coughlin, 1956 – sports anchor/reporter for WJW Fox 8 in Cleveland
Phil Donahue, 1953 – television talk show host
 Christopher R. Fee, professor, medievalist
Jerry McKenna, 1956 – sculptor
Patrick K. O'Donnell, 1988 – author and military historian
Michael Symon, 1987 – Iron Chef; co-host of The Chew
Nick Nemeth (Stage name Dolph Ziggler), 1998 – WWE wrestler
Johnny Gargano (real name John Anthony Nicholas Gargano) – WWE wrestler

Business
Tom Coughlin, 1967 – former vice-chairman of Wal-Mart
Jack Kahl, 1958 – owner of Manco

Politics 
Francis Allegra, 1974 – United States Court of Federal Claims Judge
Ed Feighan, 1965 – former U.S. Congressman
Bryan Flannery, 1986 – former member of the Ohio House of Representatives
Mark F. Giuliano – former Deputy Director of the Federal Bureau of Investigation
Terrence O'Donnell, 1964 – Ohio Supreme Court Justice

Religious
Fr. Richard V. Warner, C.S.C., 1957 – 12th Superior General of Congregation of Holy Cross

Science and Medicine 

 George Bosl, 1965 – American cancer researcher at the Memorial Sloan-Kettering Cancer Center

Sports
 Domenic Abounader, 2013 – wrestler, silver medalist for Lebanon at 2018 Asian Games.
 Stetson Allie, 2010 – professional baseball player, currently with Oklahoma City Dodgers
 Rodney Bailey, 1997 – former NFL defensive end
Ryan Bertin, 2000 – two-time NCAA Wrestling Champion at University of Michigan
Alex Boone, 2005 – NFL offensive tackle
Roger Chandler, 1992– wrestling head coach at Michigan State University
Sam Clancy, Jr., 1998 – former NBA basketball player
Tom Cousineau, 1975 – Ohio State and NFL linebacker, first pick in 1979 NFL Draft, member of College Football Hall of Fame
Andrew Dowell, 2015 – NFL player
Alan Fried, 1989 – NCAA champion wrestler, four-time Junior National Freestyle Champion, author
Johnny Gargano, 2004 – WWE Superstar
DeJuan Groce, 1998 – former NFL cornerback
Todd Harkins, 1987 – former player for NHL's Calgary Flames and Hartford Whalers
Jim Heffernan, 1982 – head coach, University of Illinois wrestling team
Alphonso Hodge, 2000 – former CFL cornerback and wide receiver
Dean Heil, 2013 – two-time NCAA champion wrestler
Chris Honeycutt, 2007 – professional MMA fighter for Bellator MMA
Andy Hrovat, 1998 – Olympic freestyle wrestler
Mark Jayne, 2000 – retired folkstyle wrestler
Kyle Kalis, 2012 – Michigan and NFL football player
Steve Logan, 1998 – professional basketball player and 2002 NCAA consensus 1st team All-American
Gray Maynard, 1998 – three-time NCAA All-American wrestler, UFC fighter
Darlington Nagbe, 2008 – professional soccer player, 2nd overall draft pick by Portland Timbers (MLS), MLS Cup Champion, United States men's national soccer team player.
 Yoshi Nakamura, 1997 – Two-time NCAA All-American wrestler at University of Pennsylvania, University National Freestyle Champion, US National Team Member, Seven-time Jr. National Judo Champion, High School National Judo Champion, Two-time State Champion Wrestling   St. Edward Athletic Hall of Fame, Eastern Intercollegiate Wrestling Association Hall of Fame, Board of Directors Beat the Streets NYC 
Haruki Nakamura, 2004 – professional football player
Lance Palmer, 2006 – professional Mixed Martial Artist, former World Series of Fighting featherweight champion
Ernie Maxim – 2006 Danville Braves, Atlanta Braves Instructional System 
Delvon Roe, 2008 – Michigan State forward
Michael Rupp, 1998 – former Minnesota Wild center Stanley Cup champion
Matt Stainbrook, 2009 – Xavier basketball player
Justin Staples, 2008 – NFL player
Jawad Williams, 2001 – former Cleveland Cavaliers player

References

External links
St. Edward official website

 
St. Edward High School (Lakewood, Ohio)
St Edw